State Road 58 is an east–west road in Central Indiana. Along its route it has concurrencies with one U.S. Route and six other Indiana state roads.

Route description
SR 58 western terminus is at State Road 63 (SR 63) in Merom.  SR 58 heads south and east towards Carlisle.  In Carlisle SR 58 has an intersection with U.S. Route 41/U.S. Route 150.  SR 58 heads southeast from Carlisle towards Freelandville.  In Freelandville SR 58 has an intersection with the northern terminus of State Road 159.  East of Freelandville SR 58 heads east and has a concurrency with State Road 67 (SR 67).  Then SR 58 heads east towards Elnora where SR 58 has a concurrency with State Road 57 (SR 57).  SR 58 heads south after the concurrency with SR 57.  South of Elnora SR 57 has an intersection with the eastern terminus of State Road 358 (SR 358).  At SR 358, SR 58 heads due east towards U.S. Route 231 (US 231), passing through Odon.  SR 58 has a concurrency with US 231, at the northern end of the concurrency is also the western terminus of State Road 45 (SR 45).  SR 45 and SR 58 heads east until SR 45 turns north.  SR 58 heads east from the western end of the concurrency with SR 45.  SR 58 then has a concurrency with State Road 54 (SR 54).  At the intersection with State Road 37 SR 54 ends and SR 58 follows SR 37 south toward Bedford.  SR 58 passes through the north part of Bedford and then heads northeast towards Columbus.  The western terminus of SR 58 is at an interchange with Interstate 65.

History 
Original SR 58 followed the same route State Road 156 follows in southeastern Indiana.  Then route was changed to a route that follows the route of today and the route that State Road 158.  SR 58 was reroute north to the route of today.

Major intersections

References 

058
Transportation in Greene County, Indiana
Transportation in Jackson County, Indiana
Transportation in Bartholomew County, Indiana
Transportation in Knox County, Indiana
Transportation in Lawrence County, Indiana
Transportation in Daviess County, Indiana
Transportation in Sullivan County, Indiana